This is a demography of the population of Guinea-Bissau including population density, ethnicity, education level, health of the populace, economic status, religious affiliations and other aspects of the population.

Ethnic groups 
The population of Guinea-Bissau is ethnically diverse with distinct languages, customs, and social structures. Most Guineans, 99%, are Black people — mostly Fula and Mandinka-speakers concentrated in the north and northeast, the Balanta and Papel, living in the southern coastal regions, and the Manjaco and Mancanha, occupying the central and northern coastal areas.

Most of the rest, 1% of its total population, are mestiços of mixed Portuguese and black descent, including Cape Verdean minority. Due to the exodus of most Portuguese settlers after independence, less than 1% of Guinea-Bissauans are pure Portuguese. The country also has a Chinese minority, including Macanese people of mixed Portuguese and Cantonese blood from Macau.

Most people are farmers. 38%-45% are Muslims - this makes Guinea-Bissau the only Portuguese-speaking nation with a sizable Muslim population. Most Muslims are Sunnis. The rest of the population are pagans, principally the Balanta, and Christians, mostly Roman Catholics.

Population

According to the 2022 revision of the world factbook the total population was 2,026,778 in 2022. The proportion of children below the age of 14 in 2020 was 43.17%, 53.75% was between 15 and 65 years of age, while 3.08% was 65 years or older. The proportion of the population below the age of 15 in 2010 was 41.3%, 55.4% were aged between 15 and 65 years of age, while 3.3% were aged 65 years or older.

Population Estimates by Sex and Age Group (01.VII.2019):

Vital statistics
Registration of vital events is in Guinea-Bissau not complete. The Population Departement of the United Nations prepared the following estimates.

Life expectancy

Other demographic statistics 
Demographic statistics according to the World Population Review in 2022.

One birth every 8 minutes	
One death every 28 minutes	
One net migrant every 360 minutes	
Net gain of one person every 11 minutes

The following demographic are from the independent Guinea-Bissau Statistical Service and from the CIA World Factbook unless otherwise indicated.

Population
2,026,778 (2022 est.)
1,833,247 (July 2018 est.)
1,596,677 (July 2011 est.)

Religions

Muslim 46.1%, folk religions 30.6%, Christian 18.9%, other or unaffiliated 4.4% (2020 est.)

Age structure

0-14 years: 43.17% (male 417,810/female 414,105)
15-24 years: 20.38% (male 192,451/female 200,370)
25-54 years: 30.24% (male 275,416/female 307,387)
55-64 years: 3.12% (male 29,549/female 30,661)
65 years and over: 3.08% (male 25,291/female 34,064) (2020 est.)

0-14 years: 43.55% (male 400,666 /female 397,704)
15-24 years: 20.23% (male 181,286 /female 189,515)
25-54 years: 29.9% (male 259,762 /female 288,300)
55-64 years: 3.29% (male 27,621 /female 32,611)
65 years and over: 3.04% (male 24,331 /female 31,451) (2018 est.)

Birth rate
36.45 births/1,000 population (2022 est.) Country comparison to the world: 12nd
37.3 births/1,000 population (2018 est.) Country comparison to the world: 13th

Death rate
7.5 deaths/1,000 population (2022 est.) Country comparison to the world: 106th
8.5 deaths/1,000 population (2018 est.) Country comparison to the world: 79th

Total fertility rate
4.69 children born/woman (2022 est.) Country comparison to the world: 14th
4.81 children born/woman (2018 est.) Country comparison to the world: 18th

Population growth rate
2.53% (2022 est.) Country comparison to the world: 21st
2.48% (2018 est.) Country comparison to the world: 23rd
1.988% (2011 est.)

Median age
total: 18 years. Country comparison to the world: 214th
male: 17.4 years
female: 18.6 years (2020 est.)

total: 17.8 years. Country comparison to the world: 216th
male: 17.2 years 
female: 18.5 years (2018 est.)

Contraceptive prevalence rate
20.6% (2018)
16% (2014)

Net migration rate
-3.63 migrant(s)/1,000 population (2022 est.) Country comparison to the world: 188th
-3.72 migrant(s)/1,000 population (2021 est.) Country comparison to the world: 189th

Life expectancy at birth
total population: 63.68 years. Country comparison to the world: 207th
male: 61.45 years
female: 65.99 years (2022 est.)

total population: 61.4 years (2018 est.)
male: 59.2 years (2018 est.)
female: 63.6 years (2018 est.)

total population: 50.23 years
male: 48.21 years
female: 52.31 years (2015 est.)

Dependency ratios
total dependency ratio: 80.4 (2015 est.)
youth dependency ratio: 75.2 (2015 est.)
elderly dependency ratio: 5.2 (2015 est.)
potential support ratio: 19.3 (2015 est.)

Urbanization
urban population: 45% of total population (2022)
rate of urbanization: 3.22% annual rate of change (2020-25 est.)

urban population: 43.4% of total population (2018)
rate of urbanization: 3.41% annual rate of change (2015-20 est.)

Sex ratio
at birth: 1.03 male(s)/female
0–14 years: 1 male(s)/female
15–24 years: 0.98 male(s)/female
25–54 years: 0.99 male(s)/female
55–64 years: 0.6 male(s)/female
65 years and over: 0.6 male(s)/female
total population: 0.95 male(s)/female (2015 est.)

Nationality
noun:Guinean (s)
adjective:Guinean

Ethnic groups
Fulani 28.5%
Balanta 22.5%
Mandinga 14.7%
Papel 9.1%
Manjaco 8.3%
Beafada 3.5%
Mancanha 3.1%
Bijago 2.1%
Felupe 1.7%
Mansoanca 1.4%
Balanta Mane 1%
Other 1.8%
None 2.2%

Languages
Crioulo 90.4%
Portuguese 27.1% (official)
French 5.1%
English 2.9%
Other 2.4%

Education expenditures
2.9% of GDP (2019) Country comparison to the world: 155th

Literacy
definition: age 15 and over can read and write
total population: 59.9%
male: 71.8%
female: 48.3% (2015 est.)

Major infectious diseases
degree of risk: very high (2020)
food or waterborne diseases: bacterial and protozoal diarrhea, hepatitis A, and typhoid fever
vectorborne diseases: malaria, dengue fever, and yellow fever
water contact diseases: schistosomiasis
animal contact diseases: rabies

note: on 21 March 2022, the US Centers for Disease Control and Prevention (CDC) issued a Travel Alert for polio in Africa; Guinea-Bissau is currently considered a high risk to travelers for circulating vaccine-derived polioviruses (cVDPV); vaccine-derived poliovirus (VDPV) is a strain of the weakened poliovirus that was initially included in oral polio vaccine (OPV) and that has changed over time and behaves more like the wild or naturally occurring virus; this means it can be spread more easily to people who are unvaccinated against polio and who come in contact with the stool or respiratory secretions, such as from a sneeze, of an "infected" person who received oral polio vaccine; the CDC recommends that before any international travel, anyone unvaccinated, incompletely vaccinated, or with an unknown polio vaccination status should complete the routine polio vaccine series; before travel to any high-risk destination, CDC recommends that adults who previously completed the full, routine polio vaccine series receive a single, lifetime booster dose of polio vaccine.

References

 
Society of Guinea-Bissau